Johanne Gauthier (born September 11, 1955) is a judge serving on the Federal Court of Appeal since 2011.

Justice Gauthier was appointed to her position as a Federal Court judge by Canadian Prime Minister Jean Chretien and to her position on the Canadian Federal Court of Appeal by Canadian Prime Minister Stephen Harper.

References

1955 births
Living people
Judges of the Federal Court of Canada
Canadian women judges
People from Montreal
Judges of the Federal Court of Appeal (Canada)
Université de Montréal alumni